The lieutenant governor of Maryland is the second highest-ranking official in the executive branch of the state government of Maryland in the United States. The officeholder is elected on the same ticket as the governor of Maryland and must meet the same qualifications.

The current lieutenant governor is Aruna Miller, who took office on January 18, 2023.

History
The position was first created by the Maryland Constitution of 1864. Under that system of government, the lieutenant governor served as president of the Senate and would assume the office of governor if the incumbent should die, resign, be removed, or be disqualified.

The state's present constitution, adopted in 1867, abolished the lieutenant governorship. However, the position was re-established by a constitutional amendment ratified on November 3, 1970.

Duties and responsibilities
Under the 1970 amendment, the lieutenant governor "shall have only the duties delegated to him by the governor." Maryland's lieutenant governorship is thus weaker than the office in several, but not all, other states that have one. For instance, in many states, including Texas, the lieutenant governor is the president of the state's Senate and in California the lieutenant governor assumes all of the governor's powers when the governor is out of the state. In both of those states, as in some others, the lieutenant governor is elected independently of the state's governor.

In practice, Maryland's lieutenant governor attends cabinet meetings, chairs various task forces and commissions, represents the state at ceremonial functions and at events with or without the governor, and advises the governor. If the governor dies, resigns or is removed from office (via impeachment conviction), the lieutenant governor becomes governor. A vacancy in the lieutenant governorship is filled by a person nominated by the governor and confirmed by a majority vote of the General Assembly voting in joint session.

List of lieutenant governors

Parties

Lieutenant governors under the Maryland Constitution of 1864
Constitution was amended to abolish the office of Lieutenant Governor after Cox's tenure.

Lieutenant governors under the Maryland Constitution of 1867
Constitution amended November 4, 1970, to re-create the office of Lieutenant Governor.

See also
Governor of Maryland
Government of Maryland
Lieutenant Governor (United States)

References

Maryland State Archives. (October 20, 2017). Maryland Manual On-Line: A Guide to Maryland Government. "Lieutenant Governor". Retrieved August 15, 2020.

 
Lieut
Maryland#